Gene A. Smith is an American historian. He is a professor of History and the director of the Center for Texas Studies at Texas Christian University. He is the author of several books.

Early life
Smith was born on Saturday, September 7, 1963, in Fort Payne, Alabama, and grew up in Albertville, Alabama.  Playing sports and serving in the Civil Air Patrol as a teen, he graduated from Albertville High School in 1981.  Growing up a University of Alabama fan, he instead chose to attend Auburn University for academic reasons—to become a veterinarian.  Ultimately, a course in chemistry put him on the path to becoming a historian. He earned a bachelor's degree at Auburn University in 1984, followed by a master's degree in 1987 and a PhD in 1991.

Career
Smith began his career during the fall of 1991 in academia at (Eastern Montana College), now Montana State University Billings. He is a professor of American History at Texas Christian University, where he is also the director of the Center for Texas Studies.

Smith is the author of five books and editor of four more books. His first book, For the Purposes of Defense': The Politics of the Jeffersonian Gunboat Program, based on his PhD dissertation, looked at Thomas Jefferson's naval strategy during the early nineteenth century and War of 1812. He authored two more books about Manifest Destiny, including Filibusters and Expansionists with Frank Lawrence Owsley, Jr. of Auburn University, which was praised as "a quality piece of historical writing" and "a valuable contribution to the historiography of expansion and the Gulf South" in The Journal of Southern History. Another book is a biography of Thomas ap Catesby Jones, who served in the War of 1812 and the Mexican–American War. Smith has also authored a book about the role of slaves in the War of 1812, which was lauded as "essential and informative reading" in the Journal of the Early Republic.

Selected works

As an author

As an editor

References

External links
Gene A. Smith on C-SPAN

Living people
People from Fort Payne, Alabama
Auburn University alumni
Montana State University Billings faculty
Texas Christian University faculty
20th-century American historians
American male non-fiction writers
21st-century American historians
21st-century American male writers
Year of birth missing (living people)
20th-century American male writers